This is the progression of world record improvements of the 200 metres W90 division of Masters athletics.

Key:

References

External links
Masters Athletics 200 m list

Masters athletics world record progressions